The Phantom Lady (Spanish: La Dama duende) is a 1945 Argentine film directed by Luis Saslavsky. At the 1946 Argentine Film Critics Association Awards the film won Silver Condor Awards for Best Film, Best Director, Best Adapted Screenplay and Best Music. It is based on a seventeenth-century comedy with the same name by Pedro Calderón de la Barca, translated as The Phantom Lady. However, the film alters the play considerably - the plot is heavily rewritten, and the style of dialogue is completely changed. Calderon's comedy is written in verse, while the screenplay of the film is in prose and contains scenes not found in the play. The final scene includes a fierce storm from which the hero rescues the heroine and declares his love for her, a scene added to the film.

It was selected as the eighth greatest Argentine film of all time in a poll conducted by the Museo del Cine Pablo Ducrós Hicken in 1977.

Plot

Cast
Delia Garcés
Enrique Diosdado
Paquita Garzón
Manuel Collado
Antonia Herrero
Amalia Sánchez Ariño
Alejandro Maximino
Helena Cortesina
Andrés Mejuto
Ernesto Vilches
María José
Manuel Díaz de la Haza
Francisco López Silva

References

External links 
 

1945 films
1940s historical comedy films
Argentine historical comedy films
1940s Spanish-language films
Argentine black-and-white films
Argentine films based on plays
Films based on works by Pedro Calderón de la Barca
Films set in the 17th century
Films directed by Luis Saslavsky
Films scored by Julián Bautista
1945 comedy films
1940s Argentine films